Daniél ua Líahaiti (died 863) was an Irish Abbot and poet.

Daniél was the Abbot of Lismore and Cork at the time of his death. The poem a ben, nennachta fort - na raid! is ascribed to him.

References

 'Gormfhlaith, daughter of Flann Sinna and the lure of the sovereignty goddess', Máirín Ní Dhonnchadha, pp. 225–237, in Seanchas: Studies in Early and Medieval Irish Archaeology, History and Literature in Honour of Francis J. Byrne, Dublin: Four Courts Press, 1999. .

863 deaths
9th-century Irish writers
People from County Cork
People from County Waterford
Year of birth unknown
9th-century Irish abbots
9th-century Irish poets
Irish male poets
Irish-language writers